Alicia is a town in Lawrence County, Arkansas, United States. The population was 124 at the 2010 census.

Geography
Alicia is located at  (35.894482, -91.083663).

According to the United States Census Bureau, the town has a total area of 0.3 km2 (0.1 mi2), all land.

List Of Highways 

 
 Highway 230

Demographics

As of the census of 2000, there were 145 people, 53 households and 46 families residing in the town. The population density was 430.7/km2 (1,126.7/mi2). There were 61 housing units at an average density of 181.2/km2 (474.0/mi2). The racial makeup of the town was 100.00% White.

There were 53 households, out of which 26.4% had children under the age of 18 living with them, 67.9% were married couples living together, 13.2% had a female householder with no husband present, and 13.2% were non-families. 13.2% of all households were made up of individuals, and 3.8% had someone who was living alone who was age 65 or older. The average household size was 2.74 and the average family size was 2.96.

In the town, the population was spread out, with 24.8% under the age of 18, 9.7% from 18 to 24, 24.1% from 25 to 44, 25.5% from 45 to 64, and 15.9% who were 65 years of age or older. The median age was 37 years. For every 100 females, there were 107.1 males. For every 100 females age 18 and over, there were 98.2 males.

The median income for a household in the town was $20,833, and the median income for a family was $22,083. Males had a median income of $20,250, compared with $25,313 for females. The per capita income for the town was $12,942. About 10.0% of families and 20.4% of the population were living below the poverty line, including 72.2% of residents under 18 and none of those over 64.

Education
It is a part of the Lawrence County School District, which operates Walnut Ridge High School.

It was formerly a part of the Walnut Ridge School District, until it merged with the Black Rock School District into the Lawrence County district on July 1, 2006.

Climate
Climate is characterized by relatively high temperatures and evenly distributed precipitation throughout the year.  The Köppen Climate Classification sub-type for this climate is "Cfa" (Humid Subtropical Climate).

References

Towns in Lawrence County, Arkansas
Towns in Arkansas